Rashad Jamal Salem (born January 18, 1979) is a Bahraini footballer currently playing for Al-Najma of Bahrain and the Bahrain national football team.

National team career statistics

Goals for Senior National Team

External links
 

1979 births
Living people
Bahraini footballers
Association football forwards
Bahrain international footballers